The Buell 1125R is a sport bike that was made by Buell Motorcycle Company in the United States. It was introduced in July 2007 for the 2008 model year. Production of road-going 1125Rs, and all Buell models, ceased in October 2009. In November 2009, Buell founder Erik Buell launched Erik Buell Racing, which initially produced race-only versions of the 1125R.

The 1125R is powered by a  Helicon V-twin engine made by BRP-Powertrain (Rotax) of Austria. The liquid-cooled engine has a V angle of 72° and produces a claimed , with a rpm limit of 10,500.

The Helicon engine's 72° layout differs from Buell's previous V-twins, which were based on 45° air-cooled Harley-Davidson Sportster motors, modified for greater efficiency and output. 

The 1125R includes a number of unconventional design attributes. The patented frame design houses the bike's fuel. The single, eight-piston front brake, called ZTL2, has a  inverted rotor that is directly attached to the front wheel rim. This enabled Buell to design a front end that was lighter and more responsive than traditional designs. The bike also uses an exhaust under the engine for greater volume. The frame, front end and exhaust all contribute to Buell's main design aim of mass centralization. Instead of a drive chain the 1125R uses a drive belt, which does not require lubrication or adjustment.

References

External links

Motorcycle.com first ride review

1125R
Motorcycles introduced in 2008
Sport bikes